The Jaguar XJ13 is a prototype racing car that was developed by Jaguar Engineering Director William Heynes to compete at Le Mans in the mid 1960s.

It never raced, and only one was produced. The car has not been officially valued, but a £7 million bid for it was declined by the owners in 1996. It was more than three times the price of a Ferrari 250 GTO at the time.

Development
Jaguar had considered the manufacture of a DOHC V12 engine as far back as 1950, initially for racing purposes, and then developing a SOHC road-going version, unlike the XK, which was designed as a production engine and later pressed into service for racing. The engine design was essentially two XK 6-cylinder engines on a common crankshaft with an aluminium cylinder block, although there were differences in the inlet porting, valve angles and combustion chamber shape. The first engine ran in July 1964.

The design structure of a mid-engined prototype was first mooted in 1960 by William Heynes, but it was not until 1965 that construction began, with the first car running by March 1966. The aluminium body exterior was designed by Malcolm Sayer, the aerodynamicist responsible for aerodynamic air flow work on the Jaguar C-type and D-type. He used his Bristol Aeroplane Company background to build it using techniques borrowed from the aircraft industry. The task of building the car was entrusted by Heynes to Engineer Derick White, Ted Brookes, Mike Kimberley, and Bob Blake in the Browns Lane experimental department's "competition shop"—Blake described by his contemporaries as "An Artist in Metal". William Heynes recognised as early as 1964 that a car such as the XJ13 needed an experienced race driver to help develop it. Jack Brabham was approached in this regard,  but the challenge was eventually taken up by ex-Jaguar Apprentice David Hobbs, who was recruited as the XJ13's main test driver. In 1969, Hobbs was included in a FIA list of 27 drivers who were rated the best in the world. Hobbs achieved an unofficial UK closed lap record with the XJ13 which stood for 32 years. For the XJ13's final test at full racing speed, Hobbs was joined at Silverstone by another racing driver (and ex-Jaguar apprentice) Richard Attwood.

The XJ13 had a mid-engine format, with the 5.0 litre V12 engine designed by Heynes and Claude Bailey. It produces 502 horsepower at 7600 rpm, mounted behind the driver, used as a stressed chassis member together with the five-speed manual ZF Transaxle driving the rear wheels.

The front suspension wishbones were similar to that of the E-Type; however, where the E-Type used longitudinal torsion bars, the XJ13 had more conventional coil spring/damper units. At the rear, there again remained similarities with the E-Type—the use of driveshafts as upper transverse links. However, the rest was different, with two long radius arms per side angling back from the central body tub together with a single fabricated transverse lower link.

The development of the XJ13, although treated seriously by the designers, was never a priority for company management (despite assistant MD Lofty England's Le Mans success in the 1950s)] and became less so following the 1966 merger with BMC. By that time, Ford had developed the 7.0 litre GT40, and so the XJ13 was considered obsolete by the time the prototype was complete. The prototype was tested at MIRA and at Silverstone, which confirmed that it would have required considerable development to make it competitive. The prototype was put into storage and no further examples were made.

MIRA crash

In 1971 the Series 3 E-type was about to be launched with Jaguar's first production V12 engine. The publicity team wanted a shot of the XJ13 at speed for the opening sequence of the film launching the V12 E-Type. On 21 January 1971, the XJ13 was taken to MIRA for the filming with Jaguar test driver Norman Dewis at the wheel. The car was driven by Dewis at speed on a damaged tyre, against the instructions of Jaguar director England. The resultant crash heavily damaged and nearly destroyed the car, although Dewis was unharmed. The wreck of the car was put back into storage.

Some years later, Edward Loades spotted the crashed XJ13 in storage at Jaguar and made the offer to 'Lofty' England that his company Abbey Panels should rebuild the car. The car was rebuilt, to a specification similar to the original, using some of the body jigs made for its original construction and at a cost of £1,000 to Jaguar. In Jaguar's own words, "The car that can be seen today is not an exact reproduction of the original."  The XJ13 made its public debut in July 1973 when 'Lofty' drove it around Silverstone at the British Grand Prix meeting. It is now displayed at the British Motor Museum at Gaydon, UK.

Replicas
Neville Swales, Building the Legend, creates "exact replicas" of the pre-crash 1966 Jaguar XJ13. His first recreation, powered by an original quad-cam prototype engine, was built with the knowledge of the Jaguar Heritage Trust and under the guidance of surviving XJ13 Team members. The car, painted and with its engine running, was shown in February 2016 at the London Classic Car show. The completed car made its first track appearance, in the company of surviving members of the original XJ13 project team, and members of William Heynes' and Malcolm Sayer's family, Jaguar VIPs and enthusiasts at Curborough (UK) on 9 August 2016. The car has been nominated as a finalist in the International Historic Motoring Awards 2016 in the category Car of the Year 

Other replicas have been produced of the post-crash (current) car:
 Proteus P90 
 Proteus XJ13-inspired coupé 
 Charles Motors Ltd replica 
 The Sports Car Factory / TWRR

Gallery

See also
Ecurie Ecosse LM69, a 2019 retro-styled homage to the XJ13

References

External links
 XJ13 page at the Jaguar Daimler Heritage Trust
 The finest Jaguar that never was Andrew Frankel of the Sunday Times tests the Jaguar XJ13
 Building The Legend

XJ13
Sports prototypes
Cars introduced in 1966
One-off cars
Rear mid-engine, rear-wheel-drive vehicles